Brezovec may refer to:

Places

Croatia
Brezovec, Croatia, a village in Međimurje County
Brezovec Zelinski, a village in Zagreb County

Slovakia
Brezovec, Slovakia, a village and municipality in the Snina District

Slovenia
Brezovec pri Polju, a village in the Municipality of Podčetrtek
Brezovec pri Rogatcu, a village in the Municipality of Rogatec
Brezovec, Cirkulane, a village in the Municipality of Cirkulane
Brezovec, Lendava, a village in the Municipality of Lendava
Sveti Trije Kralji, Radlje ob Dravi, a village in the Municipality of Radlje ob Dravi, named Brezovec from 1955 to 1993

People with the surname
Josip Brezovec (born 1986), Croatian football midfielder

See also
Brezovac (disambiguation)
Brezovice (disambiguation)